Abeh Mohammadjan (also Romanized as Ābeh Moḥammadjān) is a village in Jeyransu Rural District, in the Central District of Maneh and Samalqan County, North Khorasan Province, Iran. At the 2006 census, its population was 291, in 64 families.

References 

Populated places in Maneh and Samalqan County